Borčice is a village and municipality in Ilava District in the Trenčín Region of north-western Slovakia.

History
In historical records the village was first mentioned in 1238.

Geography
The municipality lies at an altitude of 229 metres and covers an area of 4.118 km². It has a population of about 377 people.

Genealogical resources
The records for genealogical research are available at the state archive "Statny 
Archiv in Bytca, Slovakia"

 Roman Catholic church records (births/marriages/deaths): 1705-1896 (parish B)

See also
 List of municipalities and towns in Slovakia

References

External links

 Official page
https://web.archive.org/web/20071116010355/http://www.statistics.sk/mosmis/eng/run.html
Surnames of living people in Borcice

Villages and municipalities in Ilava District